Built for the French Line, Antilles was a near-sister to  of 1952.  Her construction was completed and her maiden voyage made in 1953.  She differed from her sister mainly because she was painted white.  She was placed on West Indies cruise service in the 1960s.

Her career was much shorter than her sister's.  On 8 January 1971, she struck a reef near the island of Mustique in the Grenadines while attempting to navigate Lansecoy Bay, a shallow and reef-filled bay on the northern side of Mustique. Why Antilles′ captain decided to sail into the narrow, shallow strait is still not known.  But on hitting the rocks the impact ruptured a fuel tank and she caught fire.  All of her passengers and crew evacuated the ship safely to the island of Mustique and they were rescued by the Cunard Line′s Queen Elizabeth 2.

The burnt-out hulk could not be freed from the reef, so the ship lay there for several months, eventually breaking in half.  Many years later she would be partially scrapped on the spot and moved just a few hundred yards to her final resting place in the channel off Lansecoy Bay.

Although the ship wrecked on a reef, reaching the site is dangerous because of the rip tides that form in the area.

Popular culture

Either  or Antilles appeared in stock footage in the 1964 Perry Mason television episode "Nautical Knot", set near Acapulco, Mexico.  The scenes on board were filmed on a studio set. P&O Line's equally popular  also appears in the episode.

References

External links

1951 ships
Cruise ships
Maritime incidents in 1971
Ship fires
Ships of the Compagnie Générale Transatlantique
Shipwrecks in the Caribbean Sea
Ships sunk with no fatalities
January 1971 events in North America